

Ælfsige was a medieval Bishop of Winchester. He was consecrated between 1012 and 1013. He died in 1032. In his will, he named Ealdorman Ælfheah as the guardian of his relatives and his last testament, as well as an estate at Crondall.

Citations

References

External links
 

Bishops of Winchester
1032 deaths
Year of birth unknown
11th-century English Roman Catholic bishops